Opera in the Heights is a non-profit, regional opera company, which is housed in the historic Lambert Hall at 1703 Heights Boulevard in Houston, Texas.

History
Opera in the Heights held its first Gala Opera Evening, a Fledermaus Party, in Lambert Hall on April 12, 1996.  A few days later, an arsonist set fire to Lambert Hall, having poured flammables onto the piano and the backstage storage.  A neighbor saw the fire in the early morning, and called the fire department, which arrived in minutes and saved the building.

Opera in the Heights held its next performance, a Gala II Concert, on May 11, 1996, with curtains hanging over fire-damaged walls.  Clean-up from the fire was financed by this benefit concert, a dinner party, and the generosity of company members and neighbors.

See also
 Houston Heights, Houston, Texas

References

External links
Opera in the Heights

Theatres in Houston
Heights
Musical groups established in 1996
1996 establishments in Texas